Jamal Alioui (born 2 June 1982) is a former professional footballer and current head coach of French Championnat National 2 side GOAL FC.

He formerly played for Perugia Calcio, Calcio Catania, F.C. Crotone, FC Metz, FC Sion, FC Nantes, Wydad Casablanca in the Moroccan league and Al-Kharitiyath in the Qatar Stars League.

Playing career
Born in Saint-Étienne, Loire, Alioui chose to play for Morocco because of his Moroccan background and ancestry. He was the captain of the Morocco team at the 2004 Olympic, behind group winners Iraq and runners-up Costa Rica.

Managerial career
Alioui retired at the end of the 2015–16 season due to a recurrent pain in his hip. He began as a coach for the U17 squad of French club FC Rive Droite. In the summer 2017, Aliuoi was hired as assistant manager for AS Miserieux Trevoux.

In the summer 2018, he was appointed manager of AS Bron Grand Lyon. Ahead of the 2019–20 season, he was appointed manager of FC Vaulx-en-Velin. On 9 January 2020, it was reported, that Alioui would resign to sign for a new challenge. Two days later, Alioui reveled, that he had been appointed assistant coach of João Aroso for Morocco U20 national team.

In June 2021, Aliouli was appointed head coach of French Championnat National 2 side GOAL FC.

Honours
Perugia
UEFA Intertoto Cup: 2003

Sion
Swiss Cup: 2008–09

References

External links
 
 
 
 
 Jamal Alioui présenté aux médias FC Nantes. 3 October 2012. 

1982 births
Living people
Citizens of Morocco through descent
Moroccan footballers
Morocco international footballers
French footballers
French football managers
French sportspeople of Moroccan descent
Moroccan expatriate footballers
Moroccan expatriate sportspeople in Switzerland
Moroccan expatriate sportspeople in Turkey
French expatriate sportspeople in Switzerland
French expatriate sportspeople in Turkey
Footballers from Saint-Étienne
Olympique Lyonnais players
A.C. Perugia Calcio players
Catania S.S.D. players
F.C. Crotone players
FC Metz players
FC Sion players
Kardemir Karabükspor footballers
Wydad AC players
Al Kharaitiyat SC players
Ligue 1 players
Serie A players
Serie B players
Swiss Super League players
Qatar Stars League players
Expatriate footballers in Italy
Expatriate footballers in Switzerland
Expatriate footballers in Turkey
Expatriate footballers in Qatar
Footballers at the 2004 Summer Olympics
Olympic footballers of Morocco
2004 African Cup of Nations players
2008 Africa Cup of Nations players
2012 Africa Cup of Nations players
Association football defenders
Moroccan expatriate sportspeople in Qatar
Moroccan expatriate sportspeople in Italy
French expatriate sportspeople in Qatar
French expatriate sportspeople in Italy